Pjetër Gjoka (3 August 1912 – 12 May 1982) was an Albanian film and theatre actor.

He started his theatre activity with the amateur groups in Shkodër in 1929. In 1947 he started to work as a full-time actor in the National Theatre of Albania after his debut in the Army Theatre. His first role was in Molière's Tartuffe. He acted in around 90 roles during his career and he was active for around 52 years, acting even when he was almost completely blind.  Some of his most acclaimed roles were those of Kharitonov, Shpend Gjeta, The Old Man (Plaku), MacDonald, Miller, Zabeliku, Klaudi, King Lear, Gjini and Ali Pasha of Gucia.

In 1961 he was one of the first four actors who was given the title of People's Artist of Albania. He also acted some artistic movies, creating very strong characters. His last role in the National Theatre of Albania was in the drama, Time before the Trial ("Epoka para gjyqit").

Along with his work as a stage actor he was also a movie actor, a director and a translator.

Role in movies
 1953: The Great Warrior Skanderbeg
 1957: Femijet e saj
 1958: Tana
 1959: Furtuna
 1969: Njesit gueril
 1970: Gjurma
 1975: Gjenerali i ushtrisë së vdekur
 1978: I treti
 1978: Yje mbi Drin
 1981: Në prag të lirisë

References

1912 births
1982 deaths
People from Ulcinj
Albanian male stage actors
Albanian male film actors
Albanian translators
Albanian screenwriters
People's Artists of Albania
Albanians in Montenegro
Albanian Roman Catholics
20th-century Albanian male actors
Yugoslav expatriates in Albania
20th-century translators
20th-century screenwriters
Yugoslav emigrants to Albania